Season in Salzburg (German: Saison in Salzburg) is a 1961 Austrian musical comedy film directed by Franz Josef Gottlieb and starring Peter Alexander, Waltraut Haas, and Gunther Philipp. It is based on the operetta Saison in Salzburg by Fred Raymond, Kurt Feltz, and Max Wallner.

Cast

References

External links

1961 films
1961 musical comedy films
Austrian musical comedy films
1960s German-language films
Films directed by Franz Josef Gottlieb
Films set in hotels
Films based on operettas
Remakes of Austrian films
Films scored by Fred Raymond
Gloria Film films